= Shehada bin Abdullah al-Yazji =

Syrian poet and translator

- Born: 1901; Syria
- Died: 1983 (aged 81–82)
- Occupations: Poet, educator, translator.
- Writing career
- Language: Arabic and French

Shehada bin Abdullah al-Yazji (Arabic: شحادة عبدالله اليازجي), a Syrian poet, educator and translator born in Syria, in 1319-1404 AH / 1901-1983 CE. He spent half a century teaching Arabic in the schools of Homs, Tartus, and Damascus. He won an award for translating Alphonse de Lamartine's poem "The Lake", which was published in the “Arab Magazine”.

== Biography ==
The poet's roots go back to the Yazji family, (Yazji) a Turkish word that means “writer”, which is a title that this family has been known for since the early 18th century, till this day. The Yaziji family is considered a huge institution in poetic composition, with many influential names in Arabic literature, including Nassif al-Yazji, Warda al-Yazji and Ibrahim al-yazji.

Shehada was born in Kasbah Marmarita, the largest village in Wadi al-Nassari, Homs-Syria. He is the eldest son of the late poet Abdullah Al-Salim al-Yaziji. He received his primary and middle school education in his home town, and graduated high school at al-Ghadeer School in Tripoli. He was fluent in both Arabic and French and began translating French as a teenager.

Yaziji compiled the most famous poems of many French poets and translated them into a Diwan called "Alqtarat ", written by the linguist Ibrahim al-Munther. He built a school in his village from the profits of the play "The Master" by the poet Pierre Corneille, which he had translated. He died at the age of 82 before completing and publishing his poetry book “Yazijiat”.

== Literary production ==
- Diwan Alqtarat
- Diwan Al Yazijiat
- Translation of the play “Al said”

Titles of some of his poets:

- Thālm yt-thlm (ظالم يتظلم).
- baʿad āl-lhyb (بعد اللهيب).
- msk ālkẖetām (مسك الختام).
